Florentia Sfakianou (born 15 July 1987) is a former Greek diver. Sfakianou, along with partner Eftihia Pappa, competed in the synchronised 10 metre platform event at the 2004 Summer Olympics in her hometown Athens. The pair finished in 8th place.

References

External links

1987 births
Living people
Greek female divers
Divers at the 2004 Summer Olympics
Olympic divers of Greece
Sportspeople from Athens